Granli is a surname. Notable people with the surname include:

Daniel Granli (born 1994), Norwegian footballer
Leif Granli (1909–1988), Norwegian politician

Norwegian-language surnames